Tottenham riots may refer to:

 Broadwater Farm riot of 1985
 The 2011 England riots which began in Tottenham